John W. Anderson (January 6, 1933 – January 15, 1998) was an American football coach. He served as the head football coach at Middlebury College from 1969 to 1972 and at Brown University from 1973 to 1983, compiling career college football record of 81–50–3. 

A native of Carlisle, Pennsylvania, Anderson was a standout guard at Ursinus College. After graduating he spent two years in the United States Army. He was an assistant coach at Northern High School and Central Dauphin High School before breaking into the college ranks as the offensive line coach at Dartmouth. In 1968 he served as the defensive line coach at Boston College. From 1969 to 1972, he was head football coach at Middlebury College. He quickly turned around the program, recording a winning record in only his second season. In 1972, Middlebury finished the season with an 8–0 record. In 1973 he was named head coach at Brown University. In 1976 he led Brown to its first Ivy League conference championship. He left Brown in 1984 to work with the New England Institute of Technology in Florida. Anderson died of a heart attack on January 15, 1998, at his home in Palm Coast, Florida.

Head coaching record

References

1933 births
1998 deaths
Boston College Eagles football coaches
Brown Bears football coaches
Dartmouth Big Green football coaches
High school football coaches in Pennsylvania
Middlebury Panthers football coaches
Ursinus Bears football players
Ursinus College alumni
People from Carlisle, Pennsylvania
People from Palm Coast, Florida